Philip H. Bruck (January 6, 1845 – January 6, 1920) was the 29th mayor of Columbus, Ohio and the 26th person to serve in that office.   He served Columbus for two consecutive terms.  His successor, George J. Karb, took office in 1897.  He died in 1920.

References

Further reading

External links
Philip H. Bruck at Political Graveyard
Photo of residence at 961 S. High St. in 1889

1845 births
1920 deaths
Burials at Green Lawn Cemetery (Columbus, Ohio)
Columbus City Council members
Mayors of Columbus, Ohio
Democratic Party members of the Ohio House of Representatives